The Cosmic Game is the fourth studio album by American electronic music duo Thievery Corporation, released on February 22, 2005, by ESL Music. After the success of their previous album The Richest Man in Babylon (2002), the guest artists on The Cosmic Game are of higher profile. The album features various styles of music including club, future-bossa, breaks, rock, and more.

The album debuted at number 74 on the UK Albums Chart, and has sold over 151,000 copies in the United States.

Track listing

Charts

Weekly charts

Year-end charts

References

2004 albums
Thievery Corporation albums